Daniel Costa Teixeira de Souza (born April 6, 1974), stage name Daniel Satti is a Brazilian film and television actor. He is known for roles in various Brazilian telenovelas such as Salve-se Quem Puder (2020), Novo Mundo (2017), Os Dez Mandamentos (2015), Carrossel (telenovela) (2012), among others, and also for the awarded short film Entreolhares (2020).

Career 

Daniel premiered in Belo Horizonte as an actor in theater in 2001 leading the comedy of customs Casa, Dinheiro e Lavada, an adaptation of the text The Cousin Of California by Joaquim Manuel de Macedo. Among other play s, he acted in Fausto (Goethe) (2007) and Trem Fantasma - Uma comédia romantica (2010). In 2004 he debuted on television making a participation in the episode Is she? of the series A Diarista TV Globo, playing Roberval. In the following years, he made other special appearances, among them, in soap operas A Favorita (2008), when he signed his first contract as a cast support, and Cama de Gato (2009), in addition to series Os Caras de Pau (2010).

In 2012, he gained notoriety when interpreting Frederico Carrilho, a good and decent family man who goes through financial difficulties and leaves his home despite loving his daughter Carmen Carrilho (Stefany Vaz), in the remake of the telenovela Carrosel. Until then, with stage name Daniel Satixe, he then started to sign as Daniel Satti after the end of this production. In the year of 2014 he joined the cast of Pecado Mortal in a special appearance as Pente-Fino, safety of contraventor Quim (Bruno Padilha) and exhibited by RecordTV.

Filmography

Films

Television

Awards and nominations

Theater

References

External links

Living people
Brazilian male television actors
1974 births
Male actors from São Paulo
Brazilian male film actors
Brazilian male telenovela actors